The Philippine Span Asia Carrier Corporation (PSACC) formerly named Sulpicio Lines currently holds the world record for the worst peacetime maritime disaster due to the sinking MV Doña Paz which is said to have claimed more than 5,000 lives in the Philippines.

Notable incidents as Sulpicio Lines

MV Doña Paz (December 1987) 
The MV Doña Paz was a Philippine-registered passenger ferry that sank after colliding with the oil tanker MT Vector on December 20, 1987. With an estimated death toll of 4,386 people and only 24 survivors, it was the deadliest peacetime maritime disaster in history.

Doña Paz was traveling from Leyte island to the Philippine capital of Manila. The vessel was seriously overcrowded, with at least 2000 passengers not listed on the manifest. In addition, it was claimed that the ship carried no radio and that the life-jackets were locked away. But official blame was directed at the MT Vector, which was found to be unseaworthy and operating without a license, lookout or qualified master.

Collision 
At the time of its sinking, the Doña Paz was sailing the route of Manila → Tacloban → Catbalogan → Manila and vice versa, making trips twice a week.[4][5]

On December 20, 1987, at 06:30, Philippine Standard Time, the Doña Paz left from Tacloban City, Leyte, for the City of Manila,[4][6] with a stopover at Catbalogan, Samar.[7] The vessel was due in Manila at 04:00 the following day, and it was reported that it last made radio contact at around 20:00.[6] However, subsequent reports indicated that the Doña Paz had no radio.[8][9] At around 22:30, Philippine Standard Time, the ferry was situated at Dumali Point along the Tablas Strait, near Marinduque.[6] A survivor later said that the weather at sea that night was clear, but the sea was choppy.[7] While most of the passengers slept, the Doña Paz collided with MT Vector, an oil tanker en route from Bataan to Masbate. The Vector was carrying 8,800 US barrels (1,050,000 L; 280,000 US gal; 230,000 imp gal) of gasoline and other petroleum products owned by Caltex Philippines.[4]

Upon collision, the Vector's cargo ignited and caused a fire on the ship that spread onto the Doña Paz. Survivors recalled sensing the crash and an explosion, causing panic on the vessel.[6] One of them, a passenger named Paquito Osabel, recounted that the flames spread rapidly throughout the ship and that the sea all around the ship itself was on fire.[6][7] Another survivor claimed that the lights onboard had gone out minutes after the collision, that there were no life vests to be found on the Doña Paz, and that all of the crewmen were running around in panic with the other passengers and that none of the crew gave any orders nor made any attempt to organize the passengers.[7] It was later said that the life jacket lockers had been locked.[9] The survivors were forced to jump off the ship and swim among charred bodies in flaming waters around the ship.[10] The Doña Paz sank within two hours of the collision, while the Vector sank within four hours.[9] Both ships sank in about 545 meters (1,788 ft) of water in the shark-infested Tablas Strait.[11]

It reportedly took eight hours before Philippine maritime authorities learned of the accident, and another eight hours to organize search-and-rescue operations.[9]

MV Doña Marilyn (October 1988) 
In the afternoon of October 24, 1988, while sailing from Manila to Tacloban City, the vessel was caught up in Typhoon Unsang and sank,[1] leaving 389 dead, with only 147 survivors.

MV Princess of the Orient (September 1998) 
September 18, 1998, the 13,935-ton, 195.1-metre (640 ft) long Princess of the Orient, sailed from Manila to Cebu during a typhoon. The ship capsized at 12:55 p.m. near Fortune Island in Batangas and sank, and out of the 388 passengers on board, 150 were killed. Passengers were floating at sea for more than 12 hours before rescuers were able to reach the survivors.[1]

Wreckage 
The wreck is resting on her port side at 122 meters (400 ft) below sea level just outside Manila Bay.[2] In the early 2000s, John Bennett and Ron Loos made the first scuba divesto the wreck site.[2][3] Due to the position of the wreck, the actual cause of the sinking may not be discovered.[3]

MV Princess of the Stars (June 2008)

Judgments 
Citing "Caltex v PSACC " jurisprudence, the Supreme Court of the Philippines, on July 24, 2008, absolved Caltex Philippines (now Chevron) from any liability in the collision between MV Doña Paz and MT Vector. In a 12-page judgment, Antonio Nachura (3rd Division) opined: “We have meticulously reviewed the records of the case and found no reason to depart from the (CA) rule. We cannot turn a blind eye to this gruesome maritime tragedy which is now a dark page in our nation's history." Vector was ordered to reimburse and indemnify Sulpicio Lines Php 800,000.00, the total amount due the Macasa family whose kin were among the passengers of MV Doña Paz (GR No. 160219, Vector Shipping Corp. v. Macasa, July 21, 2008). In Caltex Philippines, Inc. v. PSACC, the Court ruled that "MT Vector was unseaworthy at the time of the accident and that its negligence was the cause of the collision that led to the sinking of the Sulpicio vessel."

PSACC appealed, on October 22, 2008, Manila Regional Trial Court (RTC) Judge Silvino Pampilo Jr.'s dismissal judgment of its P4.45 million damage lawsuit against respondents Philippine Atmospheric, Geophysical and Astronomical Services Administration (Pag-asa) director Prisco Nilo and weather services chief Nathaniel Cruz. Earlier, however, Sulpicio's chief executive officer, Carlos Go, suffered a stroke and was in stable condition at a Cebu City hospital.

Forged contract 
In the MV Princess of the Stars sinking, the company forged a contract with the international firm Titan Salvage Corporation to undertake the retrieval of a cargo of highly toxic chemicals, endosulfan et al., owned by Del Monte Corporation Philippines and Bayer CropScience.

According to an SMS text message sent by Sulpicio Lines Marketing VP Jordan Go to the ABS-CBN newsdesk, the recovery deal (which is valued at US$7.55 Million) which was signed at the Traders Hotel in Manila early in the evening by Sulpicio VP Edgar Go and Titan commercial manager Amit Wahi. Go added that the removal process of the chemicals would take 30 days in 4 stages, and before that there will be an initial mobilization period that could last two to three weeks. "As we committed to the DOTC and Congress, we are proceeding with the priority removal of Del Monte and Bayer's misdeclared cargo without quibbling about the legalities. Our foremost concern is to defuse the environmental time bomb. After this, equally urgent will be the retrieval by divers of bodies of the victims still inside our ill-fated ship," Edgar Go said in a statement released Thursday evening.  According to the contract, the next step is the retrieval of remaining bunker oil in the ship simultaneously with the cargo removal. Finally, the shipwreck would be removed from the waters off Romblon.

Board of Marine Inquiry final report 
The 5-member Philippines Board of Marine Inquiry, in its 65-page report dated August 25, 2008 (submitted to the Maritime Industry Authority or Marina), found PSACC and its captain liable for the MV Princess of the Stars June 21 maritime tragedy. The BMI recommended that Marina “consider the suspension of the Certificate of Public Convenience (CPC) of Sulpicio Lines in accordance with existing laws, rules and regulations (and its criminal liability for the sinking." The final report blamed human error, and ruled that the ship's missing and presumed dead captain, Florencio Marimon, "miscalculated" the risk of continuing the trip to Cebu while the storm raged: "There was a failure of the master to exercise extraordinary diligence and good seamanship thereby committing an error of judgment.The immediate cause of the capsizing of MV Princess of the Stars was the failure of the Master to exercise extraordinary diligence and good seamanship thereby committing an error of judgment that brought MV Princess of the Stars in harm's way into the eye of typhoon Frank or Typhoon Fengshen (2008). It is found negligent for its failure to exercise its duty in ensuring that they transport passengers and cargo safely to (their) destination.”

PSACC said 52 survived the tragedy and 312 bodies were recovered of 825 passengers listed. The rest were declared missing and presumed dead.PSACC may appeal within 30 days, the Board's recommendation to the Maritime Industry Authority (Philippines) and the Department of Transportation. Meanwhile, cargoes of 5 toxic pesticides and other poisonous substances are still on board the ferry and will be refloated on September. Sulpicio Lines, the 2nd largest cargo carrier in the Philippines, accounts for 40% of all cargo movement across the country.

Retrieval of bodies and toxic chemicals 
Meanwhile, Task Force Princess of the Stars head Elena Bautista stated that salvage crews from the Titan Salvage and Harbor Star recovered 178 barrels of endosulfan from a 40-foot container van inside the capsized ferry. And on October 5, 2008, divers finished retrieving 402 containers or more than 10 metric tons of endosulfan inside the container van. Philippine Coast Guard Commandant Wilfredo Tamayo stated the divers will thereafter retrieve a smaller Bayer chemical shipment and some 200,000 liters of fuel from the ship.

The Philippine Coast Guard reported only 57 survived the maritime tragedy, around 350 bodies had been recovered, while 515 people missing were allegedly trapped inside the capsized vessel. On October 28, 2008, 40 bodies were recovered from Deck C, the vessel's economy section, by 16 divers of salvage group Harbor Star and from the Coast Guard. The NBI's Doctor Bautista said, thereafter, the DNA matching, assisted and funded by the Interpol, would be done in the International Commission for Missing Persons laboratory in Sarajevo, Bosnia and Herzegovina. Over 200 bodies were recovered and identified so far.
 As of November 1, a total of 113 bodies were recovered, the latest from Deck B.

Termination of retrieval and wreck removal 
PCG commandant Vice Adm. Wilfredo Tamayo stated: “The [salvor firm Harbor Star] has informed our officer that they are done. They recovered 199 bodies after they scoured decks C, B and A (during the 2-week retrieval operations from October 26 to November 10, 2008). The number of cadavers extracted from the ship was less than half of the missing passengers. We are not expecting to see 500 bodies. We would be lucky to get half of that. It was likely that some of those who were still missing had jumped from the 23,000-ton ship before giant waves overwhelmed it." Divers, however, failed to enter the engine room, and some areas, due to inaccessibility and danger. The bodies were stored on the MV Tacloban Princess, where a team of forensic doctors from the National Bureau of Investigation (NBI) and Interpol were waiting for identification of the bodies in Cebu City and end in the Commission for Missing Persons, in Sarajevo.

The next phase is the 23,000-ton vessel wreck removal by Task Force Princess of the Stars, led by chief Elena Bautista (before the December 8 town fiesta).

Notable incidents as Philippine Span Asia Carrier Corporation (PSACC)

Collision with M/V Thomas Aquinas (August 2013) 

On 16 August 2013 at 8:45pm as it approached Cebu City's harbor, the 2Go ferry the M/V St. Thomas Aquinas, formerly the SuperFerry 2, collided with the cargo ship the Sulpicio Express Siete of Sulpicio Lines and sank in 144 meters of water off Lauis Ledge Talisay, Cebu. The ship was carrying 831 people—715 passengers and 116 crewmembers. 629 people were rescued immediately.  31 bodies had been recovered, leaving 172 unaccounted for. The Sulpicio Express Siete with 36 crew members on board did not sink and returned safely to port. It had a large hole in its bow above the water line, clearly visible in news photos.

Legal controversies 
Despite figuring in three major maritime disasters in the span of 11 years (from 1987 to 1998) resulting in the deaths of more than 4,500 people, the company was never held liable by the Philippine courts. PSACC has been accused of heavily overloading its ships, such as on MV Doña Paz when only 1,500 people appeared in the ship's manifest out of the 4,500 passengers and crew.  As a result, PSACC has been referred to in the press as "Perwisyo (Nuisance) Lines" or "Suspicious Lines."

See also 

 MT Vector
 List of maritime disasters in the Philippines

References

Maritime incidents in the Philippines